The term WIF or WiF may refer to:

 ISO 639:wif or Wik-Me'nh is a Paman language of the Cape York Peninsula of Queensland, Australia
 Mercenaries 2: World in Flames, video game
 Wallet Import Format, a format used to import Bitcoin private keys
 Water in Fuel Sensor, a type of water sensor
 Water immersion facility, a neutral buoyancy pool used for the Gemini and Apollo space programs
 Web Impact Factor, in webometrics
 West Indies Federation, a former federation of British Caribbean colonies
 WIF 933 or Widerøe Flight 933, a 1982 plane crash in the Barents Sea near Gamvik, Norway
 WIF domain, a protein domain
 WIF1, a lipid-binding protein
 Windows Identity Foundation, authentication software technology by Microsoft
 Women in Focus, a Canadian feminist film organization
 World Investment Forum, a United Nations Conference on Trade and Development (UNCTAD) Division on Investment and Enterprise